Gaudelia Díaz Romero (born in 1964) is a Mexican former paralympic athlete who competed mainly in category B1 distance events. She is also a singer, pianist and actress who has performed under the pseudonym Crystal since the 1980s. Among her hits are "Suavemente" and "No Me Pregunten Por Él".

In the 1990s, Díaz was part of the Mexican team that traveled to Barcelona, Spain for the 1992 Summer Paralympics. There she competed in the 800 meters (ended fourth), 1500m (ended fourth) and 3000m, the last one earned her a bronze medal.

Early life and musical career
Gaudelia Díaz Romero was born in Acapulco, Guerrero, in 1964. Díaz was born blind in a poor family, with her brothers harassing her as she was growing up. She learned to play the piano by ear. She began practicing various sports as a child, including skating, soccer and gymnastics, but gave up the last one because of the need to see the parallel bars. Instead, a friend invited her to go running and she became interested in  running.

Around 1981, Díaz met , a Mexican record producer, and both composed "Suavemente", which was selected for the 1982 OTI Festival and made it to the finals. Díaz and Andrade started dating and he became her manager. After this, their relationship became violent as Andrade constantly threatened to physically attack her. According to an interview given to Mara Patricia Castañeda, Díaz said that Andrade psychologically humiliated her when she made mistakes in her singing or piano playing, including one occasion at the World Popular Song Festival in Japan where he threatened to break her arm to justify why she could not play the piano on that occasion. Their relationship lasted three years until she realized that she was not living in a normal situation. Mexican singer Juan Gabriel helped her leave Andrade after asking him for advice. Because of that, Andrade did not let her perform at the 1984 OTI Festival the song "Tiempos Mejores", a song about a blind person expecting better times, which ultimately ended up being sung by Yuri and that would win the national contest.

Sports career
Díaz participated in the 1991 Parapan American Games, held in Puerto Rico—at the time the games had no official recognition—where she won gold in the 400, 800 and 1500 meters events. The next year, she participated in the 1992 Summer Paralympics in Barcelona, at the 800, 1500 and 3000 meters events. She ended third in the last one and fourth in the others, earning her a bronze medal. She left her career in athletics due to a lack of support.

Post-Paralympics and personal life
After her return from Barcelona, Emilio Azcárraga Milmo, then-CEO of Televisa, asked her to join the company. She acted in the telenovela Lazos de Amor. At some point, she met Miguel Ángel Huerta, whom she married. Both were in charge of the Sports Federation for the Blind and Visually Impaired (Huerta is also visually impaired but to a lesser degree), and Huerta was director of the Mexican Paralympic Committee. As of 2021, Díaz has stated that she is single and living in Acapulco, where she aids visually impaired children with musical education.

Discography
Adapted from AllMusic and iTunes.

 Suavemente (1982)
 Eso No Se Hace (1983)
 Acaríciame el Alma (1985)
 Noche Mágica (1986)
 Mis Secretos (2001)
 Las Canciones de Mi Vida (2002)
 Sentimientos de México (2003)
 Homenaje a Juan Gabriel (2008)
 De una Vez por Todas (2011)

Filmography
Lazos de Amor – Soledad Jiménez
Desde Gayola – Mirosnada

References

External links
 
 
 

1964 births
Athletes (track and field) at the 1992 Summer Paralympics
Blind actors
Blind musicians
Living people
Medalists at the 1992 Summer Paralympics
Mexican actresses
Mexican women pianists
Mexican women singers
Paralympic athletes of Mexico
Paralympic bronze medalists for Mexico
Paralympic medalists in athletics (track and field)
Sportspeople from Acapulco
Mexican female middle-distance runners
Visually impaired middle-distance runners
Paralympic middle-distance runners